DZHB-TV, channel 6, is a commercial relay television station owned by Intercontinental Broadcasting Corporation. The station's transmitter is located at Mt. Sto. Tomas, Tuba, Benguet Province.

Areas of Coverage
Baguio
Benguet

See also
List of Intercontinental Broadcasting Corporation channels and stations

Television stations in Baguio
Intercontinental Broadcasting Corporation stations
Television channels and stations established in 1980